Logan High School may refer to one of several high schools in the United States:

Logan High School (Kansas) — Logan, Kansas
Logan High School (New Mexico) — Logan, New Mexico
Logan High School (Utah) — Logan, Utah
Logan High School (West Virginia) — Logan, West Virginia
Logan High School (La Crosse, Wisconsin) — La Crosse, Wisconsin
Benjamin Logan High School — Bellefontaine, Ohio
Logan Correctional Center — Lincoln, Illinois
Logan County High School — Russellville, Kentucky
Logan Elm High School — Circleville, Ohio
Logan High School (Ohio) — Logan, Ohio
Logan South Campus School — Logan, Utah
James Logan High School - Union City, California